Over and Out is the fourth and final studio album by American post-hardcore band Tar, released in 1995 through Touch and Go Records.

Two outtakes from the album were released by fanzine Chunklet in 2012.

Critical reception
MusicHound Rock: The Essential Album Guide praised the album's "stripped down" sound and "new, menacing darkness." The Chicago Reader wrote that "Mark Zablocki and front man John Mohr lock their lean, meaty guitars together into unfussy dual riffs, simultaneously neat and jagged, that add an extra jolt of momentum to the precise, bulldozer-simple pounding of drummer Mike Greenlees." Trouser Press called the album Tar's "best and most varied," writing that "the emotional centerpiece is the tumultuous 'Building Taj Mahal', which ruminates on a band’s last stand: 'I am familiar with the concept of filler,' sings Mohr, but adds, 'This one is special.'"

Track listing

Personnel

Performers

John Mohr - vocals, electric guitar
Mark Zablocki - electric guitar, e-bow
Mike Greenlees - drum set
Tom Zaluckyj - electric bass guitar, electric guitar, vocals
Al Johnson - vocals on "Known Anomalies"

Production

Bob Weston - Recording engineering
Steve Albini - Recording engineering

References

External links
 

1995 albums
albums produced by Steve Albini